Jasienica  is a village in the administrative district of Gmina Ziębice, within Ząbkowice Śląskie County, Lower Silesian Voivodeship, in south-western Poland. Prior to 1945 it was in Germany, then called Heinzendorf.

The village has a population of 70. It is the birthplace of German author Christoph Hein.

References

Jasienica